Rožat is a small village near Dubrovnik, Croatia, with a population of 340 (census 2011).

Rožat is located close to the Adriatic tourist road between the villages of Komolac and Prijevor. Rožat is located on the north coast of the Rijeka Dubrovačka bay, and is about 5 kilometers northwest of the city of Dubrovnik.

Economy

In the village people engaged with fishing, tourism and agriculture.

History

In Rožat there is one Catholic church and the Franciscan Monastery of the Visitation of the Blessed Virgin Mary (Our Lady of Visitation). It was built in 1393 by the Bosnian Franciscans.

References

External links

Populated places in Dubrovnik-Neretva County